Vishnevka is a rural locality (a settlement) and the administrative center of Spasskoye Rural Settlement, Verkhnekhavsky District, Voronezh Oblast, Russia. The population was 808 as of 2010. There are 6 streets.

Geography 
Vishnevka is located 8 km west of Verkhnyaya Khava (the district's administrative centre) by road. NIIOKH is the nearest rural locality.

References 

Rural localities in Verkhnekhavsky District